The Town of Bow Mar is a Statutory Town located in Arapahoe and Jefferson counties, Colorado, United States. The town population was 853 at the 2020 United States Census with 587 residing in Arapahoe County and 266 residing in Jefferson County. Bow Mar is a part of the Denver-Aurora-Lakewood, CO Metropolitan Statistical Area and the Front Range Urban Corridor. The current mayor of Bow Mar is Bryan Sperry.

History

As the Denver-area grew in the late 19th century, the area that is now known as Bow Mar was developed as an agricultural area. It was home to several large farms that provided for both Denver and nearby Littleton. The name Bow Mar is derived from combining the names of two nearby lakes, Bowles Lake and Marston Lake. The lakes were named for two pioneering farmers in the area, Joseph Bowles and John Marston. The Bowles family farmhouse and barn can today be found south of the town of Bow Mar.

As Denver grew in the post-World War II era, Bow Mar farmland was purchased to develop the area into single-family housing. Homes were first constructed in what is now Bow Mar in the late 1940s and early 1950s. In 1947, the first home was built in Bow Mar by land developed by Lloyd and Eleanor King. The neighborhood was largely built up by the end of the 1950s. Bow Mar was incorporated as a town in 1958 as a town that straddled both Arapahoe and Jefferson counties. When built, many homes in Bow Mar reflected Frank Lloyd Wright's prairie-style architecture. Homes were constructed upon acre lots and were placed on wide streets, and were limited to being no more than one story tall. Today, many houses in the area are being updated or replaced with new construction.

Bow Mar maintains a public beach for residents that is utilized year-round for concerts, gatherings, or other neighborhood events. The Bow Mar Yacht Club hosts regattas during summer months on Bow Mar Lake.

Geography

At the 2020 United States Census, the town had a total area of  including  of water.

Demographics

As of the census of 2000, there were 847 people, 295 households, and 264 families residing in the town. The racial makeup of the town was 97.76% White, 0.71% Asian, 0.24% from other races, and 1.30% from two or more races. Hispanic or Latino of any race were 3.78% of the population.

There were 295 households, out of which 40.3% had children under the age of 18 living with them, 82.4% were married couples living together, 5.1% had a female householder with no husband present, and 10.5% were non-families. 8.1% of all households were made up of individuals, and 4.4% had someone living alone who was 65 years of age or older.  The average household size was 2.87 and the average family size was 3.04.

In the town, the population was spread out, with 27.3% under the age of 18, 3.3% from 18 to 24, 20.7% from 25 to 44, 32.0% from 45 to 64, and 16.8% who were 65 years of age or older.  The median age was 44 years. For every 100 females, there were 99.3 males.  For every 100 females age 18 and over, there were 96.8 males.

The median income for a household in the town was $112,300, and the median income for a family was $119,377. Males had a median income of $88,442 versus $61,667 for females. The per capita income for the town was $53,558.  About 2.4% of families and 3.4% of the population were below the poverty line, including 1.6% of those under age 18 and 2.2% of those age 65 or over.

Education
The Bow Mar homes situated in Arapahoe County attend part of the Littleton School District. There are fourteen elementary schools, four middle schools, three high schools, and two charter schools in the district

Brian Ewert is the Superintendent of Schools.

Homes that are within the Jefferson County borders, attend Jefferson County Public Schools.

See also

Colorado
Bibliography of Colorado
Index of Colorado-related articles
Outline of Colorado
List of counties in Colorado
List of municipalities in Colorado
List of places in Colorado
List of statistical areas in Colorado
Front Range Urban Corridor
North Central Colorado Urban Area
Denver-Aurora, CO Combined Statistical Area
Denver-Aurora-Lakewood, CO Metropolitan Statistical Area

References

External links

Town of Bow Mar website
CDOT map of the Town of Bow Mar

Towns in Arapahoe County, Colorado
Towns in Jefferson County, Colorado
Towns in Colorado
Denver metropolitan area